The Women's 200m Individual Medley event at the 11th FINA World Aquatics Championships swam on 24 and 25 July 2005 in Montreal, Canada. Preliminary and Semifinals heats were 24 July; the Final was 25 July.

At the start of the event, the existing World (WR) and Championships (CR) records were:
WR: 2:09.72 swum by Yanyan Wu (China) on 17 October 1997 in Shanghai, China
CR: 2:10.75 swum by Yana Klochkova (Ukraine) on 21 July 2003 in Barcelona, Spain

Results

Final

Semifinals

Preliminaries

References

Swimming at the 2005 World Aquatics Championships
2005 in women's swimming